Infinito is the eighth studio album from Italian rock band Litfiba and the last one to feature vocalist Piero Pelù. It remains the band's best selling album to date and the only one to reach 1.000.000 copies sold, despite being criticized by fans for its softer, more commercial sound.

Track listing
 "Il mio corpo che cambia" – 4:00
 "Mascherina" – 4:09
 "Sexy dream" – 4:39
 "Canto di gioia" – 4:09
 "Nuovi rampanti" – 4:27
 "Prendi in mano i tuoi anni" – 3:55
 "Vivere il mio tempo" – 4:25
 "Frank" – 3:14
 "Incantesimo" – 5:43

Personnel
Piero Pelù – Vocals
Ghigo Renzulli – Guitars
Franco Caforio – Drums
Roberto Terzani – Keyboards
Daniele Bagni – Bass
Andrea Giuffredi – Flugelhorn, Flute

Produced by Ghigo Renzulli and Piero Pelù

Litfiba albums
1999 albums
EMI Records albums
Italian-language albums